Daniel Octavian Spiridon (born 29 March 1984) is a Romanian former professional footballer who played as a midfielder for FCM Bacău, FC Botoșani, SC Bacău and CF Brăila.

References

External links
 
 

1984 births
Living people
Sportspeople from Vaslui
Romanian footballers
Association football midfielders
Liga I players
Liga II players
FCM Bacău players
FC Botoșani players
AFC Dacia Unirea Brăila players